Ravadinovo is a village in Sozopol Municipality, in Burgas Province, in southeastern Bulgaria. As of 2013 it has 691 inhabitants.

The village is situated at a distance of 2.5 km from the Black Sea, at the north-eastern foothills of Medni Rid Ridge, which is itself the north-eastern extreme of the Bosna Ridge in the Strandzha Mountains. Ravadinovo is located at some 6 km of the municipal centre Sozopol on the Bulgarian Black Sea coast. The village was established in 1913 by Bulgarian refugees from Eastern and Western Thrace.

Citations

References

 

Villages in Burgas Province